Container gardening or pot gardening/farming is the practice of growing plants, including edible plants, exclusively in containers instead of planting them in the ground.  A container in gardening is a small, enclosed and usually portable object used for displaying live flowers or plants. It may take the form of a pot, box, tub, basket, tin, barrel or hanging basket.

Methods 
Pots, traditionally made of terracotta but now more commonly plastic, and window boxes are the most commonly seen. Small pots are called flowerpots. In some cases, this method of growing is used for ornamental purposes. This method is also useful in areas where the soil or climate is unsuitable for the plant or crop in question. Using a container is also generally necessary for houseplants. Limited growing space, or growing space that is paved over, can also make this option appealing to the gardener. Additionally, this method is popular for urban horticulture and urban gardening on balconies of apartments and condominiums where gardeners lack the access to the ground for a traditional garden.

Species
Many types of plants are suitable for the container, including decorative flowers, herbs, cacti, vegetables, and small trees and shrubs. Herbs and small edible plants such as chili peppers and arugula can be grown inside the house, if there is adequate light and ventilation, and on outdoor terraces, larger vegetables may be planted.

Planting 

Containers range from simple plastic pots, to teacups, to complex automatically watered irrigation systems. This flexibility in design is another reason container gardening is popular with growers. They can be found on porches, front steps, and—in urban locations—on rooftops. Sub-irrigated planters (SIP) are a type of container that may be used in container gardens.

Re-potting 
Re-potting is the action of placing an already potted plant into a larger or smaller pot.  A pot that fits a plant's root system better is normally used.  Plants are usually re-potted according to the size of their root system.  Most plants need to be re-potted every few years because they become "pot-" or "root-bound".  A plants' roots can sense its surroundings, including the size of the pot it is in, and increasing the pot size allows plant size to increase proportionally.

Gallery

See also 

 Dutch flower bucket
 List of garden types
 Seedling
 Urban compost

References

External links 

University of Illinois Container Gardening Guide
Container Vegetable Gardening

Types of garden
Horticultural techniques
Garden features
Urban agriculture